Ecuador–Spain refers to the current and historical relations between Ecuador and Spain. Both nations are members of the Association of Academies of the Spanish Language and the Organization of Ibero-American States.

History

Spanish colonization

Ecuador and Spain share a long history since the arrival of the first Spanish conquistadores led by Francisco Pizarro in 1532. By 1534, Pizarro managed to overcome the Incan Empire (which extended from present day Ecuador, Bolivia, Peru and Chile) and claimed the territory for Spain. In 1534, Spanish troops battled against General Rumiñahui and his army during the Battle of Mount Chimborazo in central Ecuador after Rumiñahui discovered the Spanish treachery and the murder of his half-brother Emperor Atahualpa. Rumiñahui burned down the secondary Inca capital (near present-day Quito) and hid the Treasure of the Llanganatis before the battle.

In 1534, Spanish conquistadores, Sebastián de Belalcázar and Diego de Almagro founded the city of San Francisco de Quito in honor of Francisco Pizarro which was built on top of the ruins of the secondary Inca capital. In 1542, the Viceroyalty of Peru was created and the territory of Ecuador was governed from its capital in Lima and administered through the Real Audiencia of Quito. In 1717, the Viceroyalty of New Granada was created with its capital in Bogotá and Ecuador was governed under the new viceroyalty.

Independence

On 10 August 1809, Ecuador was the first country in Spanish America to declare independence soon after Napoleon’s invasion of Spain in 1808.  The independence movement became known as the Luz de América. Immediately, the criollo rebels of Ecuador lacked the anticipated support for their cause and they returned power back to the crown authorities who became brutal and punished the rebels severely.

In 1822, armies led by Simón Bolívar and Antonio José de Sucre arrived to Ecuador and fought Spanish troops at the Battle of Pichincha near Quito which secured Ecuador's independence. Ecuador soon became part of the Gran Colombia along with Colombia, Venezuela and Panama. Ecuador became an independent nation in May 1830.

Post independence

In 1840, Ecuador and Spain established diplomatic relations with the signing of a Treaty of Peace and Friendship between both nations. In 1866, Ecuador declared war against Spain during the Chincha Islands War which also involved Bolivia, Chile and Peru.

In 1936, Ecuadorian writer Demetrio Aguilera Malta (member of the Guayaquil Group) was in Spain when the Spanish Civil War broke out. Aguilera wrote about his experience during the war in his book titled Madrid: reportaje novelado de una retaguardia heroica. In May 1980, Spanish King Juan Carlos I paid an official visit to Ecuador, his first and only visit to the country.

Migration
In 2013, there were 456,000 Ecuadorian citizens living in Spain. Many of the Ecuadorians in Spain arrived in the 1990s during the Ecuador financial crisis which led to the country adopting the U.S. dollar. In 2013, 21,000 Spanish citizens resided in Ecuador. Between 2008 and 2015, 35,000 Spanish citizens arrived to Ecuador of which 36% were born in Spain and 62% were Spanish citizens of Ecuadorian origin.

Bilateral relations
Over the years, several agreements and treaties have been signed by both nations such as an Agreement on Dual-Citizenship (1964); Agreement on Technical Cooperation (1971); Tourism Agreement (1971); Air Transportation Agreement (1974); Agreement on Cultural Cooperation (1974); Agreement on Atomic Energy Cooperation for Peaceful Purposes (1977); Extradition Treaty (1989); Agreement on the avoidance of Double-Taxation (1991); Agreement on Migration (2001); Agreement on the Recognition of Driver's License's issued by both nations (2003) and an Agreement on the participation of citizens who legally reside in either Ecuador or Spain to participate in local elections (2009).

Transportation
There are direct flights between both nations with Air Europa and Iberia.

Trade
In 2017, trade between Ecuador and Spain totaled €256 million Euros. Ecuador's main exports to Spain include: canned tuna, shrimp, flowers, frozen fish and bananas. Spain's main exports to Ecuador include: capital goods and industrial inputs; frozen fish and consumer goods. In 2016, Spanish investments in Ecuador totaled US$626 million. Spanish multinational companies such as Repsol, Mapfre and Telefónica operate in Ecuador.

Resident diplomatic missions
 Ecuador has an embassy in Madrid and consulates-general in Alicante, Barcelona, Málaga, Murcia, Palma de Mallorca and Valencia.
 Spain has an embassy in Quito and a consulate-general in Guayaquil.

See also  
 Foreign relations of Ecuador
 Foreign relations of Spain
 Ecuadorians in Spain

References 

 
Spain
Bilateral relations of Spain
Relations of colonizer and former colony